Iker Martínez de Lizarduy Lizarribar  (born 16 June 1977 in Donostia-San Sebastián, Basque Country) is a Spanish sailor and olympic champion. Martínez de Lizarduy won a gold medal in the 49er class with Xabier Fernández at the 2004 Summer Olympics in Athens.  The same pairing won the silver medal at the 2008 Summer Olympics.

Iker Martínez was skipper for Team Telefónica in the 2011-2012 edition of the Volvo Ocean Race, with Fernandez also being a team member.  They were also named ISAF Rolex World Sailors of the Year 2011, finding out while they were competing in the first leg of the Volvo Ocean Race.

He also skippered Spanish yacht MAPFRE in the 2014-2015 edition of the Volvo Ocean Race, albeit he skipped a few legs to prepare himself for the 2016 Rio Olympics.

Main achievements
2001
World Championship 	Malcesine (Italy), 2nd position ;
European Championship 	Brest (France), 2nd position ;
2002 	
World Championship 	Kaneohe (United States of America), 1st position ;
European Championship 	Grimstad (Norway), 1st position ;
2003 	
European Championship 	Laredo (Spain), 3rd position ;
2004 	
Olympic Games   	Athens  (Greece), 1st position ;
World Championship 	Athens  (Greece), 1st position ;
2006 	
European Championship 	Weymouth (United kingdom), 3rd position ;
2007 	
European Championship	Marsala (Italy), 1st position ;
2008 	
European Championship 	S'Arena (Spain), 1st position ;
Olympic Games           Beijing (China), 2nd position ;
2009
Volvo Ocean Race        (RTW), 3rd position;
2010
Barcelona World Race    (RTW), 2nd position (with Xabi Fernandez);

References

1977 births
Living people
Spanish male sailors (sport)
Sailors at the 2004 Summer Olympics – 49er
Sailors at the 2008 Summer Olympics – 49er
Sailors at the 2012 Summer Olympics – 49er
Olympic sailors of Spain
Olympic gold medalists for Spain
Olympic silver medalists for Spain
Sportspeople from San Sebastián
Olympic medalists in sailing
Medalists at the 2008 Summer Olympics
Medalists at the 2004 Summer Olympics
Volvo Ocean Race sailors
49er class world champions
ISAF World Sailor of the Year (male)
Luna Rossa Challenge sailors
World champions in sailing for Spain
Sailors (sport) from the Basque Country (autonomous community)